Kevin Kinte Bentley (born December 29, 1979) is a former American football linebacker who played in the National Football League. He was originally drafted by the Cleveland Browns in the fourth round of the 2002 NFL Draft. He played college football at Northwestern. Kevin went to high school at Montclair Prep in Van Nuys where he spent three years under the coaching of George Ginnanni and defensive coordinator John Greaves.

Bentley has also been a member of the Seattle Seahawks, Houston Texans, San Diego Chargers and Jacksonville Jaguars.

Professional career

Seattle Seahawks
Bentley signed a contract with Seattle Seahawks in 2005 season. He help lead the Seahawks to the NFC Championship Game and beat the Carolina Panthers by the score 3414. They would face the Pittsburgh Steelers in Super Bowl XL they would fall short by the score 2110.

Houston Texans
Bentley signed a free agent contract with the Houston Texans on March 2, 2008.

San Diego Chargers
On August 24, 2011, Bentley signed with the San Diego Chargers. He was released during final cuts.

Jacksonville Jaguars
The Jacksonville Jaguars signed Bentley on November 22, 2011. He was released on December 5.

Indianapolis Colts
On December 6, he was signed by the Indianapolis Colts.

Kevin retired after the 2011 season.

Personal life
Bentley earned his MBA from Rice University in 2015, and is currently a Cert-III level snowboard coach with Team Summit Colorado. He is currently on the MGA TOUR with the ATLMGA chapter.  His alias is "Smart Stick" or #KBCLOSE

References

1979 births
Living people
People from North Hills, Los Angeles
Players of American football from Los Angeles
American football linebackers
Northwestern Wildcats football players
Cleveland Browns players
Seattle Seahawks players
Houston Texans players
San Diego Chargers players
Jacksonville Jaguars players
Indianapolis Colts players
Montclair College Preparatory School alumni